Unio tumidus, the swollen river mussel, is a species of freshwater mussel, an aquatic bivalve mollusc in the family Unionidae, the river mussels. 

Subspecies
  † Unio tumidus ludwigi Wenz, 1922

Synonyms

 Mya depressa Donovan, 1801 (a junior synonym)
 Mysca solida W. Turton, 1822 junior subjective synonym
 Unio (Tumidusiana) tumidus Philipsson, 1788 · 
 Unio (Unio) conus Spengler, 1793 · 
 Unio (Unio) muelleri Rossmässler, 1838 (a junior synonym)
 Unio (Unio) tumidus Philipsson, 1788 · 
 Unio conus Spengler, 1793 · 
 Unio gerstfeldtianus Clessin, 1880 ·  (a junior synonym)
 Unio inflata Hecart, 1833 (unavailable; a junior homonym of Unio inflatus Studer, 1820) 
 Unio lauterborni F. Haas, 1909 (a junior synonym)
 Unio limosus var. maxima Mörch, 1864 (a junior synonym)
 Unio muelleri Rossmässler, 1838 · 
 Unio ovalis (Montagu, 1803) · 
 Unio rhenanus Kobelt, 1886 (a junior synonym)
 Unio tumidus gerstfeldtianus Clessin, 1880 (a junior synonym)
 Unio tumidus ilekensis Kobelt, 1911 (a junior synonym)
 Unio tumidus var. bashkiricus Zhadin, 1938 (a junior synonym)
 Unio tumidus var. borysthenensis Kobelt, 1880 (a junior synonym)
 Unio tumidus var. corrosus Zelebor, 1851 (a junior synonym)
 Unio tumidus var. falcatulus Drouët, 1881 (a junior synonym)
 Unio tumidus var. fridmani Zhadin, 1938 (a junior synonym)
 Unio tumidus var. heckingi Colbeau, 1868 (a junior synonym)
 Unio tumidus var. kobeltianus Zhadin, 1938 · 
 Unio tumidus var. limicola Mörch, 1864 (a junior synonym)
 Unio tumidus var. moltschanovi Zhadin, 1938 (a junior synonym)
 Unio tumidus var. okae Kobelt, 1911 (invalid; junior homonym of Unio...) 
 Unio tumidus var. picta Mörch, 1864 · 
 Unio tumidus var. rohrmanni Kobelt, 1880 (a junior synonym)
 Unio tumidus var. saccatus Rossmässler, 1858 (a junior synonym)

Distribution
Its native distribution is European.

Croatia
 Czech Republic - in Bohemia, in Moravia, vulnerable (VU)
 Germany
 Germany - high endangered (Stark gefährdet) 
 Germany - Listed as a specially protected species in annex 1 in Bundesartenschutzverordnung.
 Latvia
 Lithuania - vulnerable
 Netherlands
 Poland
 Slovakia
 Sweden
 British Isles - in England

References

External links
 Retzius A.J. (1788). Dissertatio historico-naturalis sistens nova testaceorum genera. Quam præside D. M. Andr. J. Retzio (...) ad publicum examen defert Laurentius Münter Philipsson. 4+23 pp. Lund.
 Spengler L. (1793). Beskrivelse over et nyt Slægt af de toskallede Konchylier, forhen af mig kaldet Chæna, saa og over det Linnéiske Slægt Mya, hvilket nøiere bestemmes, og inddeles i tvende Slægter. Skrivter af Naturhistorie-Selskabet. 3(1): 16-69, pl. 2

<div align=center>
Right and left valve of the same specimen:

</div align=center>

tumidus
Molluscs of Europe
Freshwater bivalves
Bivalves described in 1788